Pascal Bonitzer (born 1 February 1946) is a French screenwriter, film director, actor, and former film critic for Cahiers du cinéma. He has written for 48 films and has appeared in 30 films since 1967. He starred in Raúl Ruiz's 1978 film The Suspended Vocation. He has a daughter, actress Agathe Bonitzer, with filmmaker Sophie Fillières.

Filmography

1960s–70s

1980s

1990s

2000s

2010s

References

External links

1946 births
Living people
French male screenwriters
French screenwriters
Film directors from Paris
Film theorists
French film critics